William Cannon (June 4, 1907 – November 14, 1990) was an American assistant director as well as a director. He was nominated for an Oscar in the dead category of Best Assistant Director at the 9th Academy Awards for the film Anthony Adverse

Selected filmography

Thirty Seconds Over Tokyo (1944)
The Wizard of Oz (1939)
Anthony Adverse (1936)
The Honeymoon Express (1926)

References

External links
 

1907 births
1990 deaths
People from Shasta County, California
People from Siskiyou County, California
Film directors from California